Linnusitamaa (also known as Linnusita saar) is a  uninhabited Estonian islet in the Gulf of Riga. Administratively Linnusitamaa belongs to the Abruka village in Lääne-Saare Parish, Saare County.

The name is a curiosity, literally meaning "bird shit land" in Estonian. However, as the Estonian word does not have as offensive connotations as the English equivalent, it would more properly be translated as "guano island".

The New York Times reported that, during the 1905 Russian Revolution against Czarist Russia, Linnusitamaa, like other Baltic islands, declared itself an independent republic.

See also
List of islands of Estonia

References

Uninhabited islands of Estonia
Saaremaa Parish
Estonian islands in the Baltic